Abdulrahman Anad (Arabic:عبد الرحمن عناد) (born 6 September 1996) is a Qatari footballer. He currently plays for Al-Arabi.

External links
 

Qatari footballers
1996 births
Living people
Al-Shahania SC players
Al-Rayyan SC players
Al-Arabi SC (Qatar) players
Place of birth missing (living people)
Qatar Stars League players
Association football midfielders
Qatar youth international footballers
Qatar under-20 international footballers